American Samoa National Olympic Committee (IOC code: ASA) is the National Olympic Committee representing American Samoa.

The headquarters are located in Veterans Memorial Stadium.

History 
The committee was recognized by International Olympic Committee on January 1, 1987.

See also 
 American Samoa at the Olympics

References 

American Samoa